William Brown (1876–unknown) was a Scottish footballer who played in the Football League for Aston Villa and Bolton Wanderers. He played in the 1904 FA Cup Final for Bolton as they lost 1–0 to Manchester City.

References

1876 births
Scottish footballers
English Football League players
Association football defenders
Beith F.C. players
Bolton Wanderers F.C. players
Aston Villa F.C. players
Plymouth Argyle F.C. players
Crystal Palace F.C. players
FA Cup Final players
Year of death missing